The 2012 Deutsche Tourenwagen Masters was the twenty-sixth season of premier German touring car championship and also thirteenth season under the moniker of Deutsche Tourenwagen Masters since the series' resumption in 2000. New regulations applied for the 2012 season (see below). BMW returned to the championship for the first time since 1994. As of 2020, it was also the last time non-European driver to won the DTM title to date.

It was a triumphant return for BMW after returning from 18 years absence, and a dismal year for Mercedes-Benz AMG only rescued by early three official victories courtesy of Gary Paffett in Hockenheimring and Brands Hatch twice and Jamie Green in Norisring only (with an exception of Ralf Schumacher and Jamie Green in Showevent Olympiastadion München relay races respectively because of exhibition event).

Calendar
An eleven-round calendar was announced on 11 November, including the non-championship event in Munich.

Teams and drivers
The following manufacturers, teams and drivers competed in the 2012 Deutsche Tourenwagen Masters. All teams competed with tyres supplied by Hankook.

Driver changes
Changed Teams
 2011 champion Martin Tomczyk left Team Phoenix and Audi to join Team RMG, one of the three teams running BMW machinery.
 2011 runner-up Bruno Spengler left Mercedes' HWA Team and also joined BMW with Team Schnitzer.
 Rahel Frey left Team Phoenix to join Abt Sportsline, with Mike Rockenfeller and Miguel Molina moving over from Abt to fill the seats at Team Phoenix.
 Christian Vietoris switched from Persson Motorsport to HWA Team.

Entering DTM
 Long-time BMW factory drivers Augusto Farfus, Joey Hand, Andy Priaulx and Dirk Werner made their début in the series with BMW. Farfus and Priaulx are driving for Team RBM, Hand for Team RMG and Werner with Team Schnitzer.
 Formula 3 Euro Series champion Roberto Merhi and Formula Renault 3.5 Series champion Robert Wickens joined Mercedes teams Persson Motorsport and Mücke Motorsport respectively.
 After competing in Auto GP, French driver Adrien Tambay joined Abt Sportsline for his debut in the series.

Leaving DTM
 Maro Engel left the series.
 Oliver Jarvis was promoted to the Audi LMP1 sportscar squad and the FIA GT1 World Championship with Team WRT, and was replaced by Adrien Tambay.
 Renger van der Zande left the DTM series.

Rule changes

Sporting
The points system for the 2012 season was changed to reflect the system used by the FIA for world championships. The top ten drivers in each race are awarded points on a scale of 25, 18, 15, 12, 10, 8, 6, 4, 2 and 1.
Refuelling during the race was banned after 12 years due to safety concerns and also avoid cut costs.

Technical
For the first time since 2003 season the DTM reintroduced the two-door coupé-style cars respectively but the two-door coupé-style cars shape were much different than 2000-2003 coupés as the new generational of Deutsche Tourenwagen Masters cars were based on 2-door coupé D-segment compact executive cars. The four-door D-segment mid-size sedan-style cars (introduced since 2004 but mandatory requirement since 2005) was permanently retired after the 2011 season. The engine configuration remained unchanged until 2018 despite the coupé-style cars' reintroduction.
After 12 years, the sequential manual gearbox shifters were replaced by newly-mandatory sequential semi-automatic paddle-shifters respectively for all DTM cars to make easier shifting rather than manual shifters.
The rear wing of all DTM cars has been changed to the single-element plane wing instead of a dual-element plane wing to create downforce.
The fuel tank capacity of all DTM cars were increased to  instead of usual  due to refuelling ban rules.
The seat of all DTM cars was integrated into the carbon fibre monocoque that is connected to a roll cage of high-strength steel due to safety concerns.
The year-old aging DTM cars were banned due to previous year cars were 4-door saloon model types.
As a result of the transition from the outgoing four-door sedan-style cars to two-door coupé-style cars, the tyre sizes of Hankook Ventus DTM tyres were also altered from 260/660-R18 (10.2/25.9-R18) on fronts and 280/660-R18 (11.0/25.9-R18) on rears to 300/680-R18 (11.8/26.8-R18) on fronts and 320/700-R18 (12.6/27.9-R18) on rears in order to improve more mechanical grip and handling while cornering to suit the driving style.

Results and standings

Results summary

Championship standings
Scoring system
Points are awarded to the top ten classified finishers as follows:

Drivers' championship 

Notes:
† — Driver retired, but was classified as they completed 90% of the winner's race distance.
‡ — No points are awarded for the non-championship Munich Olympiastadion event.

Teams' championship 

Notes:
† — Driver retired, but was classified as they completed 90% of the winner's race distance.
‡ — No points are awarded for the non-championship Munich Olympiastadion event.

Manufacturers' championship 

Notes:
‡ — No points are awarded for the non-championship Munich Olympiastadion event.

References

External links
 The official website of the Deutsche Tourenwagen Masters (English)

Deutsche Tourenwagen Masters seasons
Deutsche Tourenwagen Masters